Saukampen may refer to:

Saukampen (Lom), a mountain in Lom municipality in Innlandet county, Norway
Saukampen (Nord-Fron), a mountain in Nord-Fron municipality in Innlandet county, Norway